Arestís Stasí (Aristides Anastassiades also known as il cipriota) was born in 1940 in Limassol, Cyprus and died in 2013 in Stuttgart, Germany. He spent his first years in the village of Platres in the Troödos mountains. He studied monumental painting, sculpture and restoration in Florence and Rome.

In the 1960s and 1970s he dedicated himself in the restoration of ancient monuments in Cyprus including the heavily damaged (due to fire) ikonostasis of the Saint Lazarus Cathedral in Larnaca.

Arestís Stasí has exhibited his art works in more than ten personal exhibitions in Cyprus and abroad.

Sculptures, mosaics, paintings and other works of art of Arestís Stasí can be seen in various places including the monastery of Machairas, Nicosia, Paphos, Limassol, the villages of Kyperounta and Omodhos.

He recently installed a museum of ancient metallurgy in the village of Katydata in the Solea valley, close to the Skouriotissa (Foukasa) mine, entailing scenographic reproductions of ancient mine galleries from the early and late Copper Age and the Roman period.

Arestís Stasí has been participating as an art consultant in many governmental and private committees and is an active member of the Cypriot Artist Society (E.KA.TE.).

External links
http://www.gallerykypriakigonia.com.cy/artists_arestis_stasi.htm
http://www.cyprus-art.com/archive_exhibitions/cyprus_corner_gallery.htm

Cypriot artists
1940 births
2013 deaths